library@esplanade (Chinese: 滨海艺术中心图书馆) is a public library managed by Singapore's National Library Board. It is located on the third floor of Esplanade Mall at Marina Centre, sited within Singapore's Downtown Core.

library@esplanade is Singapore's first public library for the performing arts (music, dance, theatre and film). It is also one of the few libraries in the world to be located within a performing arts complex, and is the second specialised boutique library in Singapore, after library@orchard.

Background and history
library@esplanade was established as part of the Government of Singapore's plan to develop the nation into a renaissance city of the 21st century. The objective of the library was to bring the performing arts to the general public and vice versa. Its specialised book collections, programmes and information services seek to enhance the understanding and appreciation of the performing arts for people from all walks of life with the aim of demystifying the arts as an elitist luxury.

The library was officially opened on 12 September 2002, by Khaw Boon Wan, then Senior Minister of State for Transport and Information, Communications and the Arts.

Amenities
Spanning a floor area of 2,300 square metres (24,760 square feet), the layout plan of library@esplanade comprises four clusters or "villages" for music, dance, theatre and film on the same level. This arrangement seeks to create a conducive environment that supports creativity, learning and entertainment for both the layperson and the professional artiste.

The library features an exhibition space known as the Innovation Gallery, a performing stage equipped with a glass projection wall and a miniature grand piano, a practice room with an upright piano and an electronic keyboard, screening rooms with home theatre systems, music sampling posts, a dance alley, a ″Silent″ Studio with electronic drums and instruments for the public to use, and a special collection room with an archive on the performing arts scene in Singapore. There is also a café in the library that is operated by a private vendor.

Collection
library@esplanade has a start-up collection of about 50,000 volumes of performing arts materials in both print and electronic formats. The collection comprises books on history and biography, instructional textbooks, periodicals and magazines, screenplays, play scripts, dance notations, and music scores.  There is also a small fiction section on novels that films are based on.

The library also has audio-visual materials that include classical, jazz and pop music CDs, as well as DVDs, VCDs and videotapes of films, dance performances, opera and orchestral performances, and Broadway theatre productions.

There are also journals, encyclopaedias and directories available for reference. The collection is international in scope, with an emphasis on the performing arts in Singapore and Asia. Like library@orchard, library@esplanade does not have any children's books.

Programmes and Exhibitions
The library works closely with practitioners and groups in the local performing arts scene to deliver programmes that reach out to various target audiences. Some of library@esplanade's regular programmes include Esplanade Co.'s Festival programmes, SSO Pre-concert talks, music performances and recitals, talks by industry veterans and arts practitioners, as well as film screenings. The programmes are held mostly on weekends at the Open Stage, and updated programme listings can be found on the library@esplanade's Facebook page.

The library also regularly features exhibitions at four main areas - Glass Display, Innovation Gallery, Dance Village, and Music Village. Notable exhibitions include displays on the Cultural Medallion Recipients in the Performing Arts, highlights from MusicSG, as well as costume displays.

See also
Culture of Singapore
Dance in Singapore
Music of Singapore

References

External links

National Library Board

Libraries in Singapore
2002 establishments in Singapore
Libraries established in 2002
Buildings and structures completed in 2002
Marina Centre
Downtown Core (Singapore)